Aishwarya Majmudar (born 5 October 1993) is an Indian singer. She gained popularity after winning the 2007–08 musical reality show STAR Voice of India - Chhote Ustad at the age of 15. She was highly praised for her performances by the judges throughout the show won the competition with Anwesha Datta Gupta. She also took part in Music Ka Maha Muqabala in Himesh Reshamiya's "Himesh's Warriors" team. She has sung several songs for Gujarati and Hindi films. She was also seen in Antakshari – The Great Challenge.

Early life
Both of Majmudar's parents are singers, and she started her vocal training in Hindustani classical music from Smt. Monika Shah at the age of three;. She took voice lessons from Purushottam Upadhyay and Aniket Khandekar. She took part in Sa Re Ga Ma Pa at the age of seven. Before entering the Chhote Ustaad competition, she was recognised for her talent by the Gujarati music industry. Majmudar delivered her first solo concert at Nagpur at the age of 11, and has performed several solo concerts across India and abroad.

Career

Recordings
Under the music direction of Gaurang Vyas, Majmudar recorded her first solo album, Aishwarya, containing Gujarati devotional songs. Her other albums include Saat Suro na Sarname, Paalav, Swarabhishek, Videshini, Niralo Mukaam, Aishwarya's Nursery Rhymes, Sapna Sathe Aishwarya, and Allak Mallak. She recorded her first playback song for the Gujarati movie Ghar maru mandir in February 2003. She recorded a theme song, "Asmani Rang Hoon", for the Hindi TV Serial Dill Mill Gayye in 2008. Her first Bollywood playback song "Hari Puttar is a dude" was released in July 2011 in the movie Hari Puttar: A Comedy of Terrors. She has recorded for four Hindi movies and completed recording "Ele Elege" for the Kannada movie, Crazy Loka in 2012. She has recorded one song "Aa Safar" for urban Gujarati movie Kevi Rite Jaish in 2012.  In 2015, she voiced Anna in the Hindi dubbing of the films Frozen (2013), Frozen Fever (2015) & In 2017 Olaf's Frozen Adventure (2017) for both speaking & singing.

Anchoring
Majmudar has also anchored several shows including Nach Baliye 4 for two weeks, Mummy ke super stars for Star TV, the special Hum Young Hindustani on NDTV-Imagine, Little Star Awards-2008, and Harmony Silver Awards 2008.

YouTube 
In 2012, Aishwarya started her YouTube channel which has over 375,000 subscribers and over 40 million views.

Recognition
Majmudar won the "Chhote Ustaad", awarded by Amitabh Bachchan on 5 April 2008 in the Amul Star Voice of India contest. She was also awarded with the "Shahu Modak Award" in 2006, "Power-100" in 2008 and "Sangeet Ratna" in 2009. She was felicitated at the Chamber of Commerce and Industry of Gujarat for her achievements on "International Girl Child Day" in 2009. She has won the Gujarat State Award for Best Playback Singer thrice. She was also commended by the Federal of Indian Association in 2008. Majmudar was invited by New York's Indian community to sing the American national anthem, followed by the Indian national anthem for the India Day Parade on 19 August 2009.Outstanding young talent in Kannada Kadri awards 2011 Mangalore.
She was invited at Lalbhai Dalpatbhai College of Engineering, Ahmedabad which is one of the engineering Institute in Gujarat to deliver a Ted Talk. The event was held on 15 April 2018.

Discography

Videography

Album

Events

References

External links
Official Website
 

1993 births
Living people
Singing talent show winners
Participants in Indian reality television series
Delhi Public School alumni
Singers from Ahmedabad
21st-century Indian singers
Bollywood playback singers
Indian women playback singers
21st-century Indian women singers
Women musicians from Gujarat